Anik may refer to:

 Anik (satellite), satellites launched by Canadian telecommunications company Telesat
 Anik, Iran, a village in South Khorasan Province, Iran
 Anik Mountain
 Anik Bissonnette, a Canadian ballet dancer
 Anik Jean (born 1977), Canadian pop and rock singer, actress and screenwriter
 Anik Matern, a Canadian actress and founder of the Dynamic Theater Factory
 Jon Anik, American mixed martial arts commentator